Guy Étienne Germain Gaucher, OCD (5 March 1930 – 3 July 2014) was a French Catholic Discalced Carmelite bishop and theologian. He served as Bishop of Meaux and was an international authority on the life and writings of Thérèse of Lisieux.

Biography 
Born in Tournan-en-Brie, he was ordained a priest on 17 March 1963 and made his religious profession into the order of Discalced Carmelites on 3 October 1968. He was named Bishop of Meaux, 27 August 1986, consecrated on 19 October 1986 by the archbishop of Paris, cardinal Jean-Marie Lustiger. A few months later, 7 May 1987, he was named auxiliary bishop of Bayeux-Lisieux in residence at Lisieux. He remained in this post until 1 July 2005 at which time he retired having reached the age limit.

At first a specialist in the writings of Georges Bernanos, he subsequently devoted his attention to the personality and writings of Thérèse of Lisieux. Amongst his many editorial works, he notably participated in the centenary Edition of the works of Thérèse.

Gaucher died on 3 July 2014 at the age of 84.

Publications
 Gaucher, Guy. The Story of a Life: St. Thérèse of Lisieux. San Francisco: Harper & Row, 1987.  Over copies in US libraries, according to WorldCat
Review, Catholic Historical Review, Apr., 1989, vol. 75, no. 2, p. 304-305
Gaucher, Guy. John and Thérèse: Flames of Love : the Influence of St. John of the Cross in the Life and Writings of St. Thérèse of Lisieux. Staten Island, N.Y.: Alba House, 1999.
Thérèse, Guy Gaucher, and Aletheia Kane. The Prayers of Saint Thérèse of Lisieux: The Act of Oblation. Washington, DC: ICS Publications, 1997.
Gaucher, Guy. The Passion of Thérèse of Lisieux: 4 April - 30 September 1897. New York: Crossroad, 1990.

References

1930 births
2014 deaths
People from Tournan-en-Brie
Bishops of Meaux